This was the second edition of the tournament. There was no defending champion as the tournament was canceled at the quarterfinals stage due to the COVID-19 pandemic.

Benjamin Bonzi won the title after defeating Liam Broady 7–5, 6–4 in the final.

Seeds

Draw

Finals

Top half

Bottom half

References

External links
Main draw
Qualifying draw

Potchefstroom Open - 1